Rüdershausen is a municipality in the district of Göttingen, in Lower Saxony, Germany. It is part of the Eichsfeld.

References

Göttingen (district)